Jason Turner (born January 2, 1971) is a Canadian retired pair skater. Born in Lethbridge, Alberta, with partner Jamie Salé, he won the bronze medal at the 1994 Canadian Figure Skating Championships and competed in the Winter Olympics that year. After his partnership with Salé broke up, he briefly skated with Andrea Bolla.

Turner has a daughter, Triston (born in 1992), with former skater Kristy Sargeant.

Competitive highlights
(with Salé)

 J = Junior level

References
 Pairs on Ice: Salé & Turner

1971 births
Living people
Canadian male pair skaters
Figure skaters at the 1994 Winter Olympics
Olympic figure skaters of Canada
Sportspeople from Lethbridge
20th-century Canadian people
21st-century Canadian people